Thomas Payment (July 6, 1853 – January 13, 1920) was mayor of Ottawa, Ontario, Canada, from 1899 to 1900.

He was born in Manotick, Ontario, in 1853. He worked as a bookkeeper with a railroad company in Maine. Later, he studied at the Ontario College of Pharmacy and opened a drug store in the Byward Market area of Ottawa. During his term as mayor, a massive fire, the Hull-Ottawa fire of 1900, started in Hull and burned across the river at the Lebreton Flats, reaching as far as Dow's Lake.

He died in Ottawa in 1920 and was buried in the Notre-Dame Cemetery.

References 

Chain of Office: Biographical Sketches of the Early Mayors of Ottawa (1847-1948), Dave Mullington

1853 births
1920 deaths
Mayors of Ottawa
Franco-Ontarian people